The Warsaw Rising Museum, in the Wola district of Warsaw, Poland, is dedicated to the Warsaw Uprising of 1944. The institution of the museum was established in 1983, but no construction work took place for many years. It opened on July 31, 2004, marking the 60th anniversary of the uprising.

The museum sponsors research into the history of the uprising, and the history and possessions of the Polish Underground State. It collects and maintains hundreds of artifacts – ranging from weapons used by the insurgents to love letters – to present a full picture of the people involved. The museum's stated goals include the creation of an archive of historical information on the uprising and the recording of the stories and memories of living participants. Its director is Jan Ołdakowski, with historian Dariusz Gawin from the Polish Academy of Sciences as his deputy.

The museum is a member organisation of the Platform of European Memory and Conscience.

Exhibitions 
The museum covers all aspects of the Warsaw Uprising.

There are exhibits over several floors, containing photographs, audio and video, interactive displays, artifacts, written accounts, and other testimonies of how life was during the German occupation of Warsaw, the uprising, and its aftermath. There are displays dedicated to each district of Warsaw. There are many free informative leaflets and flyers (in Polish and English), including 63 calendar pages covering the dates from 1 August 1944 to 2 October 1944 – each containing a summary of the most important events that took place on that particular day of the uprising.

Some of the many sections and exhibits include:
 The "little insurgent" room: dedicated to the youngest insurgents and children's experience of the uprising. The room includes a replica of the "little insurgent" monument and a colourised photograph of Róża Maria Goździewska, a girl who was known as "the little nurse".
 Kino palladium: a small cinema showing a continuous stream of original footage taken by insurgent filmographers in 1944, which was used to produce newsreels that were shown in Warsaw's Palladium cinema during the uprising. 
 Sewer replicas: one on the mezzanine floor and another in the basement – a chance to experience the practice of using the sewers to move through German-held territory (without the sewage). 
 Insurgent hospital: help for the wounded during the uprising.
 Hangar: a hall containing a full-size B-24 Liberator.
 Large cinema: on the ground floor, it presents a film reconstructed of newsreels. It concludes with Chopin's Prelude in D Minor, Op. 28 no. 24. 
 Observation tower: panoramic views of Warsaw from the top of the building.
 Print shop: a room containing original typewriters and printing equipment used for producing underground newspapers during the German occupation.
 City of Ruins: a short 3D movie of the ruins of Warsaw taken from the air in 1945.
 Nazi section: the horrors of the German occupation and the atrocities committed by the Germans and their collaborators during the uprising.
 Communist section: the Soviet takeover of Poland, Stalin's puppet government, lack of help for the uprising, and the fate of the Polish resistance in post-war communist Poland.

Other highlights 
 A 1940s style cafe
 Freedom park: over 30 posters featuring colourised photographs taken during the uprising 
 Freedom park: a replica of the Kubuś armoured car, manufactured by the insurgents of the Powiśle district of Warsaw during the uprising 
 Freedom park: remnants of a statue of Józef Poniatowski that was blown up by the Germans after the uprising 
 Freedom park: street art inspired by the Warsaw Uprising 
 A memorial wall with thousands of names of the fallen and the "Monter bell"
 A wall, known as the heart of the museum, with sounds of battle and heartbeats emanating from it
 Souvenir shops (one inside the museum and one in the ticket office)
 The Warsaw Fotoplastikon, a 1905 stereoscopic theatre used by the Polish underground, now preserved and operated by the Warsaw Uprising Museum as an off-site branch at 51 Jerusalem Avenue

Gallery

See also
Home Army
Operation Tempest
Warsaw Uprising Monument
Cultural representations of the Warsaw Uprising
Museum of the Second World War

References

External links 

 Warsaw Rising Museum (official website)
 Warsaw Rising Museum at Google Cultural Institute

Museums in Warsaw
Warsaw Uprising
Platform of European Memory and Conscience
Wola
World War II museums in Poland
Registered museums in Poland
Museums established in 2004
1983 establishments in Poland
Recipients of the Silver Medal for Merit to Culture – Gloria Artis
Recipients of the Bronze Medal for Merit to Culture – Gloria Artis